Herrold is an unincorporated community in Polk County, Iowa, United States. Herrold is located in Jefferson Township. The state capital and county seat of Des Moines is slightly over 10 miles to the southeast.

The historic Herrold Bridge crosses the Beaver Creek to the west of the community.

History
Herrold's population was 75 in 1925.

References 

Unincorporated communities in Polk County, Iowa
Unincorporated communities in Iowa